Leticia Dutra (born ) is a Brazilian group rhythmic  gymnast. She represents her nation at international competitions. She competed at world championships, including at the 2010  World Rhythmic Gymnastics Championships.

References

1993 births
Living people
Brazilian rhythmic gymnasts
Place of birth missing (living people)
South American Games gold medalists for Brazil
South American Games silver medalists for Brazil
South American Games medalists in gymnastics
Competitors at the 2010 South American Games